Biston brevipennata is a moth of the family Geometridae. It is found in China (Tibet) and Nepal.

References

Moths described in 1982
Bistonini